Stackin Chips is the debut studio album by American rap group 3X Krazy. It was released on April 8, 1997 through Noo Trybe Records. Production was handled by Tone Capone, One Drop Scott, Ali Malek, Ant Banks, Bosko, Lev Berlak, Mike Dean, N.O. Joe, and Spenc. It features guest appearances from Luniz, Harm, Mr. Spence, Christión, Cydal, E-40, Dru Down, Mike Marshall, Pleasure and Seagram. The album made it to No. 136 on the Billboard 200, No. 28 on the Top R&B/Hip-Hop Albums and No. 6 on the Top Heatseekers. One single, "Keep It on the Real," peaked at No. 19 on the Hot Rap Tracks, which was based on the 52nd Steet's 1985 song, "Tell Me How It Feels."

Track listing

Charts

References

External links

3X Krazy albums
1997 debut albums
Albums produced by Bosko
Albums produced by N.O. Joe
Albums produced by Ant Banks
Albums produced by Mike Dean (record producer)